A Berlin (or Berline) carriage was a type of covered four-wheeled travelling carriage with two interior seats. Initially noted for using two chassis rails and having the body suspended from the rails by leather straps, the term continued in use for enclosed formal carriages with two seats after the suspension system changed from leather straps to steel springs.

Origin

The carriage was designed around 1660 or 1670 by a Piedmontese architect commissioned by the General quartermaster to Frederick William, Elector of Brandenburg. The Elector used the carriage to travel from Berlin, Brandenburg's capital, to the French capital of Paris, a distance of  where his carriage created a sensation. While heavy-duty vehicles had used double-railed frames before, passenger vehicles had normally used a single rail. The elegant but durable style was widely copied and named "berline" after the city from which the carriage had come. It was more convenient than other carriages of the time, being lighter and less likely to overturn. The berline began to supplant the less practical and less comfortable state coaches and gala coaches in the 17th century.

British and American sources mention a separate hooded rear seat for a footman detached from the body in their definitions of a berlin carriage, in a similar fashion to a stagecoach.

Development
In the 18th century, the steel spring became widely used in carriage suspensions, supplanting the berline's twin-strap suspension system. The term "berline" survived as a description of the formal or ceremonial body style with two bench seats facing each other in a closed carriage.

Smaller carriages mainly for town use were developed from the berline by removing the rear-facing front seat and shortening the enclosure. This style became known as the "halbberline" in Germany and the "berline coupé" (cut berline) in France. The name "berline coupé" was later shortened to "coupé".

Automobile

The berline body style initially carried over from the carriage to the automobile with the chauffeur in the open at the front and an enclosure behind with two seats facing each other as opposed to facing forward. As with the coupé and the brougham, the term evolved with the deletion of the outside driver and the movement of the controls into the enclosure, along with the turning of the front seat to face forward. The term "berline" is now the French term for the saloon or sedan.

See also 
 Carriage#Types of horse-drawn carriages

Notes

References

External links
Berlin coach Clipart Educational Technology Clearinghouse, University of South Florida. Sketch.

The Long Island Museum of American Art, History & Carriages - Collection Database. Search berlin carriage, record type Objects (photo and text).
MNC - Colecção: Berlindas National Coach Museum (Museu dos Coches), Lisbon (Portugal). Illustrations and text.
Музеи Московского Кремля Moscow Kremlin Museum. Photo.

Carriages